Druse can refer to:
 Druze or Durzi, a Middle Eastern religious community
 Druse (botany), an aggregation of calcium oxalate crystals found in certain plants
 Druse (geology), an incrustation of small crystals on the surface of a rock or mineral
 Drusen, pathological deposits in the eye

See also
 Druce (disambiguation)